The Desert National Wildlife Refuge is a protected wildlife refuge, administered by the U.S. Fish and Wildlife Service, located north of Las Vegas, Nevada, in northwestern Clark and southwestern Lincoln counties, with much of its land area lying within the southeastern section of the Nevada Test and Training Range. The Desert NWR, created on May 20, 1936, is the largest wildlife refuge in the lower 48 states of the United States, encompassing  of the Mojave Desert in the southern part of Nevada. The refuge was originally established at 2.25 million acres. In 1940 840,000 acres were transferred to the Department of Defense.

This Range is part of the larger Desert National Wildlife Refuge Complex, which includes the Ash Meadows National Wildlife Refuge, the Moapa Valley National Wildlife Refuge, and the Pahranagat National Wildlife Refuge. All of these refuges are managed from a central office, have similar ecology, and similar management needs. Fish and Wildlife Service staff are shared between all of these refuges.

Description

The Range can be accessed from U.S. Route 95 via Corn Creek Road.

Perpetuating the desert bighorn sheep and its habitat is the most important objective of the range. The Range actively improves bighorn habitats by developing new water sources and maintaining and improving existing ones. Numerous other wildlife species share the range with bighorns.

In addition to wildlife the Range also boasts an abundance of plant communities. Plant communities and wildlife found on the Range vary with altitude and climate. Most of these plant species can be seen while driving the Mormon Well Road (which can be accessed from the Corn Creek Field Station). The desert shrub community, composed of creosote bush and white bursage are the dominant shrubs in the hottest, lowest elevations of Desert National Wildlife Range. Above the valley floor, Mojave yucca and cactus become abundant. Above  desert woodlands, composed of single-leaf pinyon, Utah juniper, and big sagebrush begin. From  Ponderosa pine and white fir are the dominant trees. Near  where the growing seasons are the shortest, the only trees surviving are bristlecone pines.

Numerous recreational opportunities are available on the Range. Camping, hiking, backpacking, and horseback riding are all popular activities enjoyed by refuge visitors. Limited hunting for bighorn sheep is permitted.

Although it is the largest National Wildlife Refuge in the lower 48 states, there are eleven larger ones in the state of Alaska.

Climate

See also 
Mormon Well Spring

References

External links 
 U.S. Fish and Wildlife Service, Desert National Wildlife Refuge Complex

Desert National Wildlife Refuge Complex
National Wildlife Refuges in Nevada
Protected areas of Clark County, Nevada
Protected areas of Lincoln County, Nevada